The Arab and Druze Scouts Movement is a coeducational member of the Israel Boy and Girl Scouts Federation. The federation consists of Muslim Arab, Christian Arab, and Druze troops.

Member organizations

The members of the federation are:
Druze Scouts Association - 5,000 members; the emblem features the Druze star and torch.
Catholic Scout Association in Israel - 3,000 members; the emblem features the Christian cross in Palestinian colors.
Orthodox Christian Scout Association - 2,500 members; the emblem features the wreath from the flag of the United Nations.
Israel Arab Scouts Association - 2,000 members.

See also
 Palestinian Scout Association

References

External links 
 Catholic Scout Association in Israel
 Christian Orthodox Scout Association

Scouting and Guiding in Israel
World Association of Girl Guides and Girl Scouts member organizations
World Organization of the Scout Movement member organizations
Arab Israeli culture